Gigatronics (1980-1992) was a Greek computer manufacturer. It produced the model "ΕΡΜΗΣ" (1984) based on the microprocessor 6502, and the personal computer "KAT" (1988) based on the microprocessors 8088 and 65C816. "ΕΡΜΗΣ" had its own operating system, database and the programming language "SUPER BASIC", while "KAT" was running in both IBM and Apple modes.

In 1986, it developed the database, spreadsheet and word processing program "Foundation" that was also distributed in the US for Apple personal computers.

References

 Financial Times, 1 Nov. 1984, https://www.dropbox.com/s/r7rhutfqml1hjk2/FIN TIMES 1984.pdf?dl=0.
 Athena Magazine, International Studies Association, Issue 22–40, p. 16, 1988.
 InfoWorld, InfoWorld Media Group Inc., Vol.7, Issue 47, p. 19, 25 Nov. 1985.
 Social Europe : Supplement on..., Office for Official Publications of the European Communities, Vol.7, p. 54-55, 1985.
 Greece : a country study, Eugene K. Keefe, American University (Washington D.C.), Foreign Area Studies, p. 184, 1986.
 Social Europe, The software industry, Office for Official Publications of the European Communities, Supplement 6/86, p. 80, 1986.

Home computer hardware companies
Greek brands
Defunct manufacturing companies of Greece